Walton is a masculine given name. For its etymology, see Walton (surname). 

Walton as a given name may refer to:

 Walt Bachrach (1904–1989), American politician, mayor of Cincinnati, Ohio
 Chadwick Walton (born 1985), West Indian cricketer
 Walton Ford (born 1960), American painter
 Walton Goggins (born 1971), American actor
 Walton Hale Hamilton (1881–1958), American law professor and economist
 Walt Kirk (1924–2012), American National Basketball Association player
 Walton Musser (1909–1998), American inventor and engineer
 Walton Walker (1889–1950), United States Army four-star general
 Walton Alfonso Webson, Antiguan diplomat

English-language masculine given names